Nasrabad District is a district (bakhsh) in Torbat-e Jam County, Razavi Khorasan Province, Iran. In the 2006 census, its population was 37,429, in 8.634 families.  The District has one city: Nasrabad.  The District has two rural districts (dehestan): Bala Jam Rural District and Karizan Rural District.

References 

Districts of Razavi Khorasan Province
Torbat-e Jam County